The Al Attar Business Tower is a 38-floor tower in Dubai, United Arab Emirates. The tower has a total structural height of 158 m (518 ft).  It was built by South African construction contractor Murray & Roberts. The owner of this business tower is Al Attar Properties which did not deliver any of their promised project even after 10 years. They have been subject of extensive lawsuits by the investors.

See also 
 List of tallest buildings in Dubai
List of tallest buildings in the United Arab Emirates 
Qatar Airways Inc
 Dubai Shopping

http://gulfnews.com/news/gulf/uae/housing-property/vue-de-lac-towers-towering-trouble-in-dubai-1.785450

https://web.archive.org/web/20121114053950/http://gulfnews.com/news/gulf/uae/housing-property/jlt-owners-still-waiting-for-homes-promised-in-2007-1.526478

http://www.constructionweekonline.com/article-6698-disgruntled-investors-storm-rera-office/

References

External links
Al Attar Business Tower Official Site

Office buildings completed in 1999
Skyscraper office buildings in Dubai
1999 establishments in the United Arab Emirates